Michael Brennan (born 29 June 1965) is a former Australian rules footballer who played with the East Fremantle Football Club in the West Australian Football League (WAFL) and the West Coast Eagles in the Australian Football League (AFL). An inaugural West Coast squad member, Brennan played mainly at full-back. He played in West Coast's 1992 and 1994 premiership sides, and won the Best Clubman award in 1995, his final season. Brennan was named in both West Coast's Team of the Decade (named in 1996) and Team 20 (named in 2006), as well as East Fremantle's Team of the Century, named in 1997. His son, Jacob Brennan, was selected by a West Coast as a father-son selection in the 2010 National draft, and made his debut in round five of the 2012 season.

Statistics

|-
|- style="background-color: #EAEAEA"
! scope="row" style="text-align:center" | 1987
|style="text-align:center;"|
| 14 || 21 || 3 || 5 || 192 || 49 || 241 || 52 || 19 || 0.1 || 0.2 || 9.1 || 2.3 || 11.5 || 2.5 || 0.9 || 2
|-
! scope="row" style="text-align:center" | 1988
|style="text-align:center;"|
| 14 || 18 || 1 || 4 || 136 || 52 || 188 || 44 || 18 || 0.1 || 0.2 || 7.6 || 2.9 || 10.4 || 2.4 || 1.0 || 0
|- style="background-color: #EAEAEA"
! scope="row" style="text-align:center" | 1989
|style="text-align:center;"|
| 14 || 16 || 2 || 4 || 148 || 52 || 200 || 48 || 12 || 0.1 || 0.3 || 9.3 || 3.3 || 12.5 || 3.0 || 0.8 || 1
|-
! scope="row" style="text-align:center" | 1990
|style="text-align:center;"|
| 14 || 25 || 3 || 1 || 167 || 94 || 261 || 57 || 23 || 0.1 || 0.0 || 6.7 || 3.8 || 10.4 || 2.3 || 0.9 || 0
|- style="background-color: #EAEAEA"
! scope="row" style="text-align:center" | 1991
|style="text-align:center;"|
| 14 || 24 || 3 || 0 || 175 || 61 || 236 || 55 || 21 || 0.1 || 0.0 || 7.3 || 2.5 || 9.8 || 2.3 || 0.9 || 0
|-
|style="text-align:center;background:#afe6ba;"|1992†
|style="text-align:center;"|
| 14 || 16 || 3 || 2 || 90 || 52 || 142 || 25 || 17 || 0.2 || 0.1 || 5.6 || 3.3 || 8.9 || 1.6 || 1.1 || 0
|- style="background-color: #EAEAEA"
! scope="row" style="text-align:center" | 1993
|style="text-align:center;"|
| 14 || 20 || 1 || 1 || 167 || 75 || 242 || 61 || 33 || 0.1 || 0.1 || 8.4 || 3.8 || 12.1 || 3.1 || 1.7 || 0
|-
|style="text-align:center;background:#afe6ba;"|1994†
|style="text-align:center;"|
| 14 || 23 || 2 || 1 || 144 || 62 || 206 || 67 || 22 || 0.1 || 0.0 || 6.3 || 2.7 || 9.0 || 2.9 || 1.0 || 0
|- style="background-color: #EAEAEA"
! scope="row" style="text-align:center" | 1995
|style="text-align:center;"|
| 14 || 16 || 2 || 1 || 101 || 48 || 149 || 41 || 12 || 0.1 || 0.1 || 6.3 || 3.0 || 9.3 || 2.6 || 0.8 || 0
|- class="sortbottom"
! colspan=3| Career
! 179
! 20
! 19
! 1320
! 545
! 1865
! 450
! 177
! 0.1
! 0.1
! 7.4
! 3.0
! 10.4
! 2.5
! 1.0
! 3
|}

External links

References

1965 births
Living people
East Fremantle Football Club players
West Coast Eagles players
West Coast Eagles Premiership players
Western Australian State of Origin players
Australian rules footballers from Perth, Western Australia
Two-time VFL/AFL Premiership players